Arzumanyan or Arzoumanian is an Armenian surname; in Armenian: Արզումանյան, Western Armenian Արզումանեան.

Notable people with the surname include:

Arzumanyan
Alexander Arzumanyan (born 1959), Armenian politician and diplomat
Andre Arzumanyan, Armenian-Iranian film score composer and pianist
Mkrtich Arzumanyan (born 1976), Armenian actor, humorist, showman, screenwriter, producer
Robert Arzumanyan (born 1985), Armenian footballer
Vladimir Arzumanyan (born 1998), Armenian singer

Arzoumanian
Ana Arzoumanian (born 1962), Argentine lawyer and writer
Baghdasar Arzoumanian (1916–2001), Armenian architect

Armenian-language surnames